Hot House is an album by pianist Walter Bishop Jr. which was recorded in 1977 and 1978 and released on the Muse label in 1979.

Reception 

David Szatmary of AllMusic stated "Excellent bebop session by this pianist".

Track listing 
 "Dahoud" (Clifford Brown) – 4:17
 "Medley: Sophisticated Lady/A Time for Love" (Duke Ellington/Brian Potter, Dennis Lambert) – 6:51
 "Hot House" (Charlie Parker) – 4:50
 "Move" (Denzil Best, Paul Welsh) – 5:15
 "My Little Suede Shoes" (Parker) – 4:41
 "Wave" (Antônio Carlos Jobim) – 4:20
 "All God's Children" (Traditional) – 2:32

Personnel 
Walter Bishop Jr. – piano
Bill Hardman – trumpet (tracks 1 & 3–5)
Junior Cook – tenor saxophone (tracks 1 & 3–5)
Sam Jones – bass
Al Foster – drums

References 

Walter Bishop Jr. albums
1979 albums
Muse Records albums